Telue (pinyin transcription: Duoluo 多罗; Tolo) or White Gelao is a Gelao language spoken in China and Vietnam.

Dialects
The primary dialectal areas where Telue (White Gelao) is still spoken are:

Guizhou, China (in Liuzhi Special District): Judu 居都
Guangxi, China (in Longlin County): Moji 磨基 (also spoken in Wantao 湾桃)
Yunnan, China (in Malipo County): Yueliangwan 月亮湾 (also spoken in Fengyan 峰岩 and Laozhai 老寨)
Vietnam (in Hà Giang Province)

Phonology 
Duoluo has many uvular and prenasalized consonants.

Consonants 

 The sound of the affricates  are frequently close to interdental affricate sounds . 
 The pronunciation of  can sometimes be close to an alveolo-palatal sound , but not as fully articulated.
  can also form a syllabic nasal .
 Sounds  mainly appear in modern Chinese loanwords.

Vowels 

  only is heard after dental/alveolar fricatives and affricates only,  is never heard in this position.

References

Kra languages
Languages of China
Languages of Vietnam